The 1978–79 Irish Cup was the 99th edition of Northern Ireland's premier football knock-out cup competition.

The defending champions were Linfield, who defeated Ballymena United 3–1 in the 1977–78 final. However, they were knocked out by eventual winners Cliftonville in the first round.  Cliftonville went on to win the cup for the 8th time, defeating Portadown 3–2 in the final. The 1979 victory represented their first cup success in 70 years; this remains a record for the longest gap between Irish Cup wins. To date, this is Cliftonville's last Irish Cup success, though they have reached the final five times since this win; in 1997, 1999, 2009, 2013 and 2018. They lost the 1997, 2009, 2013 and 2018 finals, and were disqualified before the final was played in 1999 when it was discovered that they had fielded an ineligible player in the earlier rounds.

Results

First round

|}

Quarter-finals

|}

1This tie required a replay, after the first game ended as a 0–0 draw.

Semi-finals

|}

2This tie required a replay, after the first game ended as a 2–2 draw.

Final

References

Irish Cup seasons
2
Northern Ireland